Warp Inc. was a Japanese video game developer. Founded by musician Kenji Eno in 1994, the company was dedicated to creating interactive cinema. Its most successful games, D and Enemy Zero, were known for their musical scores. Warp rebranded as Super Warp Inc. exited the video game industry in 2000, and was superseded by the developer From Yellow to Orange Inc. in 2001. Eno headed the company until his death in February 2013.

History 
Kenji Eno founded Warp in 1994. The Warp logo—four television screens displaying the four letters of the company name—was designed by Eno and designer Tomohiro Miyazaki. Warp developed several interactive cinema games, their most successful series being D. In 2000, following the release of D2, Warp changed its name to Super Warp and exited the video game industry, widening its scope to network services, DVD products, and online music.

Following an investment by Neoteny Inc., Super Warp was succeeded by From Yellow to Orange (FYTO) in 2001. FYTO released the game You, Me, and the Cubes in 2009. Eno headed the company as president and chief executive officer (CEO) until his death February 2013. Katsutoshi Eguchi subsequently became the company's CEO. Eno's final project, Kakexun, became a collaborative effort between FYTO and Naoya Sato's company Warp2.

Games developed 
 Totsugeki Kikan (Karakuri) Megadasu!! (1994, 3DO)
 Trip'd (1995, 3DO, PlayStation)
 Oyaji Hunter Mahjong (1995, 3DO)
 D (1995, 3DO/Sega Saturn/PlayStation/MS-DOS)
 Short Warp (1996, 3DO)
 Enemy Zero (1996, Sega Saturn/Microsoft Windows)
 Real Sound: Kaze no Regret (1997, Sega Saturn/Dreamcast)
 D2 (1999, Dreamcast)

As From Yellow to Orange Inc.
 You, Me, and the Cubes (2009, Wii)
 Kakexun (TBA)

References

External links 
 
 

Japanese companies established in 1994
Video game companies established in 1994
Video game companies of Japan
Video game development companies